KRJC (95.3 FM, "All American Country") is a radio station licensed to serve Elko, Nevada. The station is owned by Paul and Ketra Gardner, through licensee Elko Broadcasting Company, Inc. It airs a country music format.

The station was assigned the KRJC call letters by the Federal Communications Commission on February 17, 1981.

References

External links
KRJC official website

RJC
Country radio stations in the United States
Radio stations established in 1981
Elko, Nevada